This article is about the demographic features of the population of Austria, including population density, ethnicity, education level, health of the populace, economic status, religious affiliations and other aspects of the population.

Austrians were a homogeneous people, although four decades of strong immigration from other parts of Europe have significantly changed the composition of the population of Austria.

According to the 2001 population census, 88.6% are native German speakers (96% Austro-Bavarian dialects and 4% Alemannic dialects) while the remaining 11.4% speak several minority languages. The non-German speakers of Austria can be divided into two groups: traditional minorities, who are related to territories formerly part of the Habsburg monarchy, and new minorities, resulting from recent immigration.

Population
Demographic statistics according to the World Population Review.
One birth every 6 minutes
One death every 6 minutes
One net migrant every 26 minutes
Net gain of one person every 26 minutes

Fertility 
The total fertility rate is the number of children born per woman. It is based on fairly good data for the entire period in the present-day Hungary. Sources: Our World In Data and Gapminder Foundation.

 Total fertility rate

1.48 children born/woman (2018 est.) Country comparison to the world: 199th

Mother's mean age at first birth

29 years (2014 est.)

Life expectancy 

Life expectancy at birth

total population: 81.7 years. Country comparison to the world: 24th
male: 79 years
female: 84.5 years (2018 est.)

Age structure 

0-14 years: 14% (male 630,739 /female 600,663)
15-24 years: 10.82% (male 484,515 /female 467,064)
25-54 years: 42.1% (male 1,851,209 /female 1,851,100)
55-64 years: 13.63% (male 595,146 /female 603,249)
65 years and over: 19.44% (male 743,174 /female 966,511) (2018 est.)

Median age

total: 44.2 years. Country comparison to the world: 12th
male: 42.9 years
female: 45.4 years (2018 est.)

Cities, urbanisation and population density 

urban population: 58.3% of total population (2018)
rate of urbanization: 0.59% annual rate of change (2015–20 est.)

Vital statistics 
Data according to Statistik Austria.

Current vital statistics

Ethnic groups

Traditional ethnic minorities in Austria
Only three numerically significant traditional minority groups exist – 14,000 Carinthian Slovenes (according to the 2001 census – unofficial estimates of Slovene organisations put the number at 50,000) in Austrian Carinthia (south central Austria) and about 25,000 Croats and 20,000 Hungarians in Burgenland (on the Hungarian border). The Slovenes (also called 'Windische') form a closely knit community. Their rights as well as those of the Croats are protected by law and generally respected in practice. The present boundaries of Austria, once the center of the Habsburg monarchy that constituted the second-largest composite monarchy in Europe, were established in accordance with the Treaty of Saint-Germain-en-Laye in 1919. Some Austrians, particularly near Vienna, still have relatives in countries that made up the Monarchy, namely Croatia, Czech Republic, Slovakia, Slovenia and Hungary.

New ethnic minorities in Austria

Austria does not collect data on the ethnicity or race of its citizens but does collect data on the nationality of residents currently in the country.

According to the Austrian Statistical Bureau, 814,800 foreigners legally lived in Austria in mid-2006, representing 9.8% of the total population, one of the highest rates in Europe.

Of these foreign residents, 305,100 came from the former Yugoslavia and 110,800 from Turkey.

Owing to a growing naturalization rate, 330,000 people have been naturalized between 1985 and the end of 2003, representing about 4% of the 7.4 million Austrian citizens living today in the country.

Of these new citizens 110,000 came from the former Yugoslavia and 90,000 from Turkey. Considering pre-1985 naturalizations, in 2005 at least 18% (in Vienna more than 30%) of the population was either foreign or of foreign origin. Native Austrians have had stagnant demographics since World War I, and have been in absolute decline since the 1970s.

Immigration
As of 2011, Statistik Austria official estimates have shown that 81% of residents, or 6.75 million had no migration background and more than 19% or 1.6 million inhabitants had at least one parent of immigrant background. There are more than 415,000 descendants of foreign-born immigrants residing in Austria, the great majority of whom have been naturalized.

According to Eurostat, there were 1.27 million foreign-born residents in Austria in 2010, corresponding to 15.2% of the total population. Of these, 764,000 (9.1%) were born outside the EU and 512,000 (6.1%) were born in another EU member state.

350,000 ethnic Turks (including a minority of Turkish Kurds) currently live in Austria. At about 3% of the total population, they make up the biggest single ethnic minority in Austria.

In 2018, the percentage of foreign born people was around 19% of the total population which is also the second highest foreign born proportion of all EU countries after Luxembourg.

Languages

German (official nationwide) 88.8% (94% Bavarian, 6% Alemannic)
Serbian 2.4%
Turkish 2.3%
Croatian (official in Burgenland) 1.3%
Slovene (official in Carinthia) 0.2–0.5%
Hungarian (official in Burgenland) 0.2%
Czech 0.2%
Slovak 0.1%
Yiddish ?%
Romani ?%
Languages of the recent immigrant groups around 10% (Census 2001 (link from Web Archive))

Religion

In 2001, about 74% of Austria's population were registered as Roman Catholic, while about 5% considered themselves Protestants. Austrian Christians, both Catholic and Protestant, are obliged to pay a mandatory membership fee (calculated by income—about 1%) to their church; this payment is called "Kirchenbeitrag" ("Ecclesiastical/Church contribution"). Since the second half of the 20th century, the number of adherents and churchgoers has declined. Data for the end of 2016 from the Austrian Roman Catholic church lists 5,162,622 members, or 58.8% of the total Austrian population. Sunday church attendance was 605,828 or 7% of the total Austrian population in 2015. The Lutheran church also recorded a loss of 74,421 adherents between 2001 and 2016.

About 12% of the population declared that they have no religion in 2001; this share had grown to 20% by 2015. Of the remaining people, around 340,000 were registered as members of various Muslim communities in 2001, mainly due to the influx from Turkey, Bosnia-Herzegovina and Kosovo. The number of Muslims has doubled in 15 years to 700,000 in 2016.  About 680,000 are members of Eastern Orthodox Church (mostly Romanians and Serbs), about 21,000 people are active Jehovah's Witnesses and about 8,100 are Jewish.

An estimated 15,000 Jews or adherents of Judaism live in Austria, primarily in Vienna – a remnant of the post-World War II community after the Nazi Holocaust.

Sikhism in Austria
Hinduism in Austria
Buddhism in Austria
Roman Catholicism in Austria
Islam in Austria
History of the Jews in Austria
Pre-Christian Alpine traditions

Newborn by religion 

In 2017, 41,259 out of the 87,633 newborns had a Catholic mother (father: 38,096), 12,514 Muslim mother (father: 12,851) and 2,635 had a Protestant mother (father: 2,352).
In 2016, 43,190 out of the 87,675 newborns had a Catholic mother (father: 38,884), 12,794 Muslim mother (father: 12,996) and 2,841 had a Protestant mother (father: 2,398).
In 2015, 41,783 out of the 84,381 newborns had a Catholic mother (father: 37,036), 10,760 Muslim mother (father: 10,972) and 2,595 had a Protestant mother (father: 2,212).

Notes

References

Further reading
Statistik Austria – Census 2001
Statistik Austria – Monthly Statistical Tables – Vital Statistics
Statistik Austria – Quarterly Population Estimates
Website of the VID (Vienna Institute of Demography)

External links
Population cartogram of Austria